All Points West may refer to:

 All Points West (monodrama), a 1937 American monodrama by Rodgers and Hart
 All Points West (radio program), a Canadian talk program
 All Points West Music & Arts Festival, a former American annual festival held in Jersey City, New Jersey